Anwar Al-Harazi (born 10 December 1972) is a Yemeni former long-distance running athlete. He represented North Yemen at the 1988 Summer Olympic Games in the men's 5000 metres and finished 16th in his heat, failing to advance. He was only aged 15 at the time.

References

External links
 

1972 births
Living people
Athletes (track and field) at the 1988 Summer Olympics
Olympic athletes of North Yemen
Yemeni male long-distance runners